Otso Virtanen (born 3 April 1994) is a Finnish footballer who plays as a goalkeeper for Ilves.

Virtanen started his professional career in 2011 at TPS, appearing primarily for their reserve team ÅIFK. Before the 2013 season, he moved to IFK Mariehamn and appeared in 22 matches. In 2014, he served primarily as the backup for Swedish goalkeeper Simon Nurme.

Virtanen signed a three-and-a-half year contract with Scottish club Hibernian on 24 January 2016. Virtanen was an unused substitute as Hibs lost the 2015–16 Scottish League Cup final to Ross County. He made his first appearance for Hibs in a 2015–16 Scottish Cup tie against Inverness, coming on as a substitute after regular goalkeeper Mark Oxley lost a contact lens. Oxley was shown a yellow card by the referee during this incident, which caused him to be suspended for the Scottish Cup semi-final. Hibs manager Alan Stubbs then signed Conrad Logan as an alternative goalkeeper, and chose to play Logan in the semi-final ahead of Virtanen.

Virtanen made one starting appearance for Hibs, playing in a 2016–17 UEFA Europa League qualifying first leg match against Brondby. He was at fault for the Brondby goal in that match and was replaced for the second leg by Ross Laidlaw. Virtanen left Hibs in January 2017 and signed for Finnish club KuPS.

In May 2014, Virtanen was selected for the Finland national under-21 team for the match against Moldova.

Honours 
Hibernian
Scottish League Cup runners-up: 2015–16

References

External links
 Otso Virtanen at IFK Mariehamn 
 
 

1994 births
Living people
Finnish footballers
Turun Palloseura footballers
IFK Mariehamn players
Veikkausliiga players
Place of birth missing (living people)
Hibernian F.C. players
Finnish expatriate footballers
Finnish expatriate sportspeople in Scotland
Expatriate footballers in Scotland
Association football goalkeepers
Kuopion Palloseura players
Åbo IFK players